Chetlat Island is a coral island belonging to the Amindivi Subgroup of islands of the Lakshadweep archipelago in India.

History
Local history says that islanders were cruelly treated by Portuguese seafarers in the past.

Coir twisting was the traditional occupation of the inhabitants and average Chetlat coir used to be equal to first-class coir of the other islands in Lakshadweep.

Geography
Chetlat is one of the populated islands of Lakshadweep. It is located 37 km to the northwest of Kiltan Island.
There is a small scale yearly growing sand spit on the northern point of the island.

Administration
Chetlat is the sole inhabited island of the township of Chetlat Island of Aminidivi Tehsil.

Economics
The inhabitants on the island are engaged in very small scale farming and fishing which are mainly for the island consumption.

Transportation
The island has a small jetty on the west coast and a helipad on southpoint.

Image gallery

References

External links

Lagoon sizes
Chetlat - Geographical information

List of Atolls
An ornithological expedition to the Lakshadweep archipelago
Sources towards a history of the Laccadive Islands
FAO - An analysis of the carrying Capacity of Lakshadweep Coral Reefs

Islands of Lakshadweep
Atolls of India
Cities and towns in Lakshadweep district
Islands of India
Populated places in India